Nani Bhattacharya Smarak Mahavidyalaya, established in 2000, is general degree college in Mangalbari, PO Jaigaon. It is in Alipurduar district. It offers undergraduate courses in arts. It is affiliated to  University of North Bengal.

Departments

See also

References

External links
University of North Bengal
University Grants Commission
National Assessment and Accreditation Council

Universities and colleges in Alipurduar district
Colleges affiliated to University of North Bengal
Educational institutions established in 2000
2000 establishments in West Bengal